The 1983–84 Idaho Vandals men's basketball team represented the University of Idaho during the 1983–84 NCAA Division I men's basketball season. Members of the Big Sky Conference, the Vandals were led by first-year head coach Bill Trumbo and played their home games on campus at the Kibbie Dome in Moscow, Idaho.

The conference tournament previously included only the top four teams; it was expanded this year to include all eight. The quarterfinals were at campus sites on Tuesday, and eighth-seeded Idaho fell to league champion Weber State.

Two Inland Empire winning streaks ended this season: after three straight wins over Washington State in the Battle of the Palouse, the Cougars beat the Vandals by thirteen points in Pullman in December. Gonzaga broke a four-game losing streak to Idaho with a seven-point win in Moscow in January; it was senior point guard John Stockton's sole win in the series.

No Vandals were named to the all-conference team; senior center Pete Prigge was honorable mention. Two years earlier as a sophomore, he was the sixth man on the successful 1982 team.

Hired in early April, Trumbo was previously the head coach at Santa Rosa Junior College in northern California; he succeeded alumnus Don Monson, who departed after five seasons for Oregon of the Pac-10 Conference.

Roster

Postseason result

|-
!colspan=6 style=| Big Sky tournament

References

External links
Sports Reference – Idaho Vandals: 1983–84 basketball season
Gem of the Mountains: 1984 University of Idaho yearbook – 1983–84 basketball season
Idaho Argonaut – student newspaper – 1984 editions

Idaho Vandals men's basketball seasons
Idaho
Idaho
Idaho